The Miami RedHawks men's ice hockey statistical leaders are individual statistical leaders of the Miami RedHawks men's ice hockey program in various categories, including goals, assists, points, and saves. Within those areas, the lists identify single-game, single-season, and career leaders. The RedHawks represent Miami University in the NCAA's National Collegiate Hockey Conference.

Miami began competing in intercollegiate ice hockey in 1978.  These lists are updated through the end of the 2020–21 season.

Goals

Assists

Points

Saves

References

Lists of college ice hockey statistical leaders by team
Statistical